Allan Toniks born Allan Ampaire is a Ugandan singer, songwriter, guitarist and record producer. He has worked and shared stages with several local and international artistes including the Goodlyfe Crew, P Square, General Ozzy (Zambia), Proff (Kenya), Petersen Zagaze (Zambia), Urban Boyz, Gal Level (Namibia), Beenie Man, Genista, (Jamaica) Sean Kingston, Jidenna, Sean Paul, Roberto (Zambia), Stella Mwangi as well as Flavour N'abania of Nigeria. He has also been nominated and won several awards. He is of Western Uganda's export with likes of Juliana Kanyomozi, Angella Katatumba and Ray G.

Early life and education
Toniks who was born in Mbarara to Dr Berinda Edward and Mrs Berinda Josephine started singing at school where he also learnt how to play the guitar and has four siblings. He went to Mbarara Preparatory School for primary, then joined King's College Budo for O Level and Ntare School for A Level before joining Makerere University Business School where he graduated with a bachelor's degree in International Business Studies in 2011.

Music
He started singing and writing songs early while in school but considered a career in music seriously while at University where he recorded his first hit single Beera nange. He is also a guitarist who also sometimes produces his own music under his record label Vibrations. Toniks considers his style of music as Urban R&B. Toniks participated in, and won the 2015 Airtel Trace Music Star Competition, the Celebrity Edition.

Discography
Beera Nange
Mu'ngatto
That Girl
Kampala Galz 
Yenze 
Nzewuwo
Swag meter
Itaano
Ningyenda Yoona
Tukyekole
Nsubiza
Regular
Private Party 
Who You Are 
Sikyetaaga
Baby Language
Mulamwa
Falling
Romance
Sunday
Sikuleka
Wonder Woman
Ensonga
Turn Around

Awards
2008
PAM Awards RnB song of the year(winner)
PAM Awards RnB artist of the year(Nominated)
MAMA Awards Listener`s Choice(Nominated)
Kisma Awards Best RnB artiste(Nominated)
Buzz Teenies` Awards Best RnB artiste(Nominated)
Buzz Teenies Awards Best RnB Song(Nominated)

2009
Buzz Teenies Awards Best RnB artiste(Nominated)

2010
SoundCity Music Video Awards(Nigeria) Best Pop Video in Africa
PAM Awards Video of the year (Nominated)
Buzz Teenies`Awards Best RnB artist (Nominated)

2011
Namibian  Music Awards Song of the year
Namibian Music Awards Video of the year
Namibian Awards for Best Collabo of the year
Buzz Teenies` Awards Best RnB artist
PAM Awards best RnB artiste(nominated)

2012
Namibian Music Awards song of the year
Namibian Music awards best collabo
Best RnB artiste buzz awards
Best RnB song buzz awards
Channel O Music Video Awards best pop video Africa(Nominated)

2013
Club Music video Awards, Best costume & design(Nominated)

2019
Zinna Awards Best contemporary RnB artiste (Nominated)
HiPipo Music Awards Best afro Pop Song

2020
Hipipo Music awards Best RnB song(Nominated)
Hipipo Music Awards Video of the year(Nominated)

References

External links
 Tonics official page

21st-century Ugandan male singers
Living people
Year of birth missing (living people)
People educated at Ntare School
People from Mbarara